Shahrekord County is in Chaharmahal and Bakhtiari province, Iran. The capital of the county is the city of Shahr-e Kord. At the 2006 census, the county's population was 362,381 in 91,273 households. The following census in 2011 counted 340,382 people in 95,406 households, by which time Kiar District had been separated from the county to participate in the formation of Kiar County. At the 2016 census, the county's population was 315,980 in 93,104 households, by which time Ben District had been separated from the county to form Ben County, and Saman District to become Saman County.

Administrative divisions

The population history and structural changes of Shahrekord County's administrative divisions over three consecutive censuses are shown in the following table. The latest census shows three districts, six rural districts, and nine cities.

References

 

Counties of Chaharmahal and Bakhtiari Province